Rosemelling is a hamlet in the civil parish of Luxulyan, Cornwall, England.

References

Hamlets in Cornwall